Methylobacterium persicinum  is a facultatively methylotrophic and aerobic bacteria from the genus of Methylobacterium which has been isolated from the rice plant Oryza sativa in Iksan in Korea.

References

Further reading

External links 
Type strain of Methylobacterium phyllosphaerae at BacDive -  the Bacterial Diversity Metadatabase

Hyphomicrobiales
Bacteria described in 2009